Elisapee Enuaraq (born 1955) is an Inuit artist.

Enuaraq lives in Clyde River, Nunavut. Her work is included in the collections of the National Gallery of Canada, the Museum of Anthropology at the University of British Columbia and the Winnipeg Art Gallery.

References

1955 births
20th-century Canadian artists
20th-century Canadian women artists
21st-century Canadian artists
21st-century Canadian women artists
Inuit artists
Living people